Margaret Joy Kartomi  (née Hutchesson) is an Australian ethnomusicologist who is known especially for her contributions to the study of Asian music. She is an emeritus professor of Monash University in Melbourne. She specialises in the music of Indonesia and Southeast Asia.

Biography
Born in Adelaide on November 24, 1940, Margaret Kartomi studied at the University of Adelaide, and then got her doctorate in musicology in Berlin, from the Humboldt University. She started at Monash University in 1969, where she had a research fellowship (1969), then a lectureship (1979), and a readership (1976); she became a professor in 1989. At Monash, she founded the Sumatra Music Archive, the Asian Music Archive, and the Australian Archive of Jewish Music.

She is on the editorial board of the Ethnomusicology Monograph Series of the University of Chicago Press, and of the Music, Dance and Theatre Iconography series of the Hollizer Wissenschaftsverlag.  She has published many books, four monographs, and a number of important journal articles.

Awards and recognition 
In 1982 Kartomi was elected Fellow of the Australian Academy of the Humanities.

She was appointed a Member of the Order of Australia in the 1991 Australia Day Honours for " service to ethnomusicology, particularly south east Asian music ".

Bernard Heinze Memorial Award
The Sir Bernard Heinze Memorial Award is given to a person who has made an outstanding contribution to music in Australia.

! 
|-
| 2015 ||Margaret J. Kartomi || Sir Bernard Heinze Memorial Award ||  || 
|-

Bibliography

References

Living people
Academic staff of Monash University
Members of the Order of Australia
Fellows of the Australian Academy of the Humanities
University of Adelaide alumni
1940 births
Australian expatriates in Germany
Ethnomusicologists